Eddie Barth (September 29, 1931 – May 28, 2010; born Edward Michael Bartholetti) was an American actor. Barth earned the nickname Mr. Gravel for his raspy vocals in his voiceover work.

Biography

Early life
Barth was born Edward Michael Bartholetti in Philadelphia, Pennsylvania.

Career
Barth portrayed Myron Fowler, the owner of Peerless Detectives, a rival detective agency in 38 episodes of the television series Simon & Simon between 1981 and 1989. Barth also portrayed a police lieutenant on the series Shaft and appeared in regular roles on Night Court; Murder, She Wrote; Civil Wars and Stone.

Barth's most well-known voiceover commercial work was for an advertising campaign for Miller Lite during the 1980s. Barth closed the Miller Lite television commercials by reading the slogan "Lite Beer from Miller. Everything you always wanted in a beer. And less.". His other voiceover credits included Superman: The Animated Series, Osmosis Jones in 2001, and the 1998 film Babe: Pig in the City.

Eddie Barth died of heart failure at his home in Los Angeles on May 28, 2010, at the age of 78.

Filmography

Film

Television

References

External links

1931 births
2010 deaths
American male film actors
American male television actors
American male voice actors
Male actors from Philadelphia
Male actors from Los Angeles
20th-century American male actors